The second USS Wanderer (SP-2440) was a patrol vessel that served in the United States Navy from 1917 to 1918.
 
Wanderer was a motorboat built in 1913 at Norfolk, Virginia, by Craig Brothers, and owned by R. F. Barret of Norfolk. She was acquired by the U.S. Navy for service as a section patrol boat during World War I. Inspected at the 5th Naval District on 13 April 1917 and designated SP-2440, she was placed in commission on the same day as USS Wanderer.

Wanderer operated on local and section patrol duties for the duration of World War I. She was returned to her owner on 30 December 1918.

Wanderer was one of two U.S. Navy ships named USS Wanderer in service simultaneously during World War I, the other being USS Wanderer (SP-132).

References

NavSource Online: Section Patrol Craft Photo Archive Wanderer (SP 2440)

Patrol vessels of the United States Navy
World War I patrol vessels of the United States
Ships built in Norfolk, Virginia
1913 ships